Peter Tilley (13 January 1930 – 11 August 2008) was a Northern Irish  professional footballer who played as a wing half.

Career
Born in Lurgan, Tilley began his career in non-league football with Mossley and Witton Albion. He later played in the Football League for Arsenal, Bury and Halifax Town, making a total of 271 appearances.

References

1930 births
2008 deaths
Association footballers from Northern Ireland
Mossley A.F.C. players
Witton Albion F.C. players
Arsenal F.C. players
Bury F.C. players
Halifax Town A.F.C. players
English Football League players
Association football wing halves